The 61st NHK Cup, or as it is officially known the  was a professional shogi tournament organized by the Japan Shogi Association and sponsored by Japan's public broadcaster NHK. Play began on April 3, 2011, and ended on March 18, 2012. The 50-player single elimination tournament was won by Yoshiharu Habu. All of the tournament games were shown each Sunday morning on NHK-E. The  during the NHK-E broadcasts was female professional Rieko Yauchi.

Participants

Preliminary tournaments
A total of 139 shogi professionals competed in eighteen preliminary tournaments to qualify for the main tournament. These tournaments were one-day tournaments held at the Tokyo Shogi Kaikan and the Kansai Shogi Kaikan, but were not televised. Each tournament consisted of seven or eight players. The initial time control for each player was 20 minutes followed by a 30-second byōyomi.

The female professional seed was determined by a play-in game between Kana Satomi and Tomomi Kai, which was won by Kai.

Brackets from two of the preliminary tournaments are shown below.

Main tournament
The first time control for main tournament games was ten minutes per player. Once this was used up, a second time control of 10 one-minute periods of  began. Each player was given 30 seconds to make their move. If they did so, then no thinking time periods were used. If, however, they did not, a thinking time period began and they then had up to one minute (more specifically 59 seconds) to make a move before entering the next thinking time period. This process was repeated until a player had used all ten thinking time periods. Then, the final byōyomi time control of 30 seconds per move then began. Sente was determined prior to each game by piece toss.

The 50 players listed below qualified for the main tournament.

Notes:
  "No." represents the bracket position of the player in their respective block and "Rank/Title" represents the rank or title(s) held by the player when the original bracket was finalized. A dan/kyū grading system is used for ranking players.
 Players whose names are in bold were seeded directly into the main tournament and are as follows:
 60th NHK Cup (four players): Habu (champion), Itodani (runner-up), Maruyama (semifinalist) and Watanabe (semifinalist).
 Seven major titleholders (two players): Hirose (Ōi) and Kubo (Ōshō and Kiō)
 Class A (seven players): Miura, Takahashi, Moriuchi, Kimura, Tanigawa, Gōda, Fujii
 Class B1 (thirteen players): Inoue,  Y. Satō, Fukaura, Namekata, Matsuo, Yamasaki, Yashiki, Suzuki, Toyokawa, Sugimoto, Hatakeyama, Nakamura, and Nakata
 Other tournament winners (one player): Abe (Shinjin-Ō)
 Female professional (one player): Kai 
 Others with outstanding records (four players): Kubota (Class B2), Tobe (Class B2), Murayama (Class C1), and Toyoshima (Class C1)
Among these 32 seeds, the following 14 were given byes in Round 1 and began play in Round 2: Habu, Itodani, Maruyama, Watanabe, Takahashi, Fujii, Inoue, Kubo, Moriuchi, Hirose, Gōda, Miura, Tanigawa, and Kimura.
 The remaining players qualified by winning preliminary tournaments.

The bracket at the start of the tournament in shown below.

Results
Winners are listed in bold. "Date" refers to the date the game was broadcast. Dan and titles are as of the date the game was broadcast. "Guest Analyst" refers to the kishi who provided commentary during the broadcast. "No. of moves" refers to the total number of moves played in the game.

Round 1
A total of 18 games were played in round 1. Play began on April 3, 2011, and ended on July 31, 2011. The 18 preliminary tournament winners were paired against 18 seeded players.

Round 2
A total of 16 games were played in round 2. Play began on August 7, 2011, and ended on November 27, 2011. The 18 winners from round 1 were joined by the 14 players who had received round 1 byes.

Round 3
Play began on December 4, 2011, and ended on January 29, 2012. Sugai, Kitajima and Akutsu were the only preliminary tournament winners make it as far as round 3. Kubo vs. Moriuchi (round 3, game 4) was the first pairing of major titleholders in the tournament.

Quarterfinals
The eight remaining players were paired off against each other with play beginning on February 5 and ending on February 26, 2012. The last remaining preliminary tournament winner (Sugai) was joined by three major titleholders (Habu, Watanabe, and Kubo), two Class A players (Kimura and Gōda) and two Class B1 players (Hatakeyama and Matsuo). Sugai's feat was even more impressive because he had only become a professional in April 2010, and this was his first time participating in the NHK Cup tournament.

Semifinals
The two remaining players from each block with paired against each other to determine the respective block winners. The 1st semifinal game between Akira Watanabe Ryūō (sente) and Toshiaki Kubo 2 crown (gote) was broadcast on March 4, 2012. Watanabe won the game in 127 moves. The guest analyst was Kōji Tanigawa 9d. The 2nd semifinal game was between Mamoru Hatakeyama 7d (sente) and Yoshiharu Habu NHK Cup (gote). The game was broadcast on March 11, 2012, and won by Habu in 108 moves. The guest analyst was Osamu Nakamura 9d.

Finals
After 112 preliminary tournament games and 48 main tournament games involving 172 players, Yoshiharu Habu NHK Cup and Akira Watanabe Ryūō met in the final which was broadcast on March 18, 2012. Habu had won the tournament the previous three years (58th NHK Cup60th NHK Cup) and was riding a 19 NHK Cup game winning streak; Watanabe, on the other hand, was looking for his first NHK Cup championship to add to the major titles he had already won. A victory over Watanabe would also be Habu's tenth NHK Cup title overall, thus making him the first player to qualify for the title of "Lifetime NHK Cup Champion". The piece toss before the game resulted in Habu being sente and he won the game in 147 moves, thus becoming the 61st NHK Cup Champion、the first player to win the tournament 4 times in a row  and the first "Lifetime NHK Cup Champion". The guest analyst for the final match were Toshiyuki Moriuchi Meijin and the hosts were NHK announcer  and female professional Rieko Yauchi. A radio broadcast of the final aired on March 20, 2012. The host was NHK announcer Nobuo Murakami and the guest analysts were Kunio Yonenaga Lifetime Kisei, Kōji Tanigawa 9d and Takanori Hashimoto 8d.

The game score and a diagram showing the final position is given below.
Sente: Yoshiharu Habu NHK Cup
Gote: Akira Watanabe Ryūō
Opening: Double Fortress (相矢倉)
1.P-7f, 2. P-8d, 3. S-6h, 4. P-3d, 5. P-6f, 6. S-6b, 7. P-5f, 8. P-5d, 9. S-4h, 10. P-4b, 11. G-5h, 12. G-3b, 13. G-7h, 14. K-4a, 15. K-6i, 16. G-5b, 17. S-7g, 18. S-3c, 19. B-7i, 20. B-3a, 21. P-3f, 22. P-4d, 23 G5h-6g, 24. P-7c, 25. S-3g, 26. B-6d, 27. B-6h, 28. G5b-4c, 29. K-7i, 30. K-3a, 31. K-8h, 32. K-2b, 33. S-4f, 34. S-5c, 35. N-3g, 36. P-9d, 37. P-1f, 38. P-1d, 39. P-2f, 40. B-7c, 41. R-3h, 42. S-2d, 43. L-1h, 44. P-9e, 45. P-6e, 46. P-8e, 47. N-2e, 48. S-4b, 49. P-3e, 50. Sx3e, 51. Sx3e, 52. Px3e, 53. P-1e, 54. S*3g, 55. R-3i, 56. Px1e, 57. P-6d, 58. Bx6d, 59. Lx1e, 60. Lx1e, 61. S*6e, 62. Sx2f+, 63. Sx6d, 64. Px6d, 65. Rx3e, 66. S*2d, 67. N-1c+, 68. Nx1c, 69. P*1d, 70. Sx3e, 71. Bx3e, 72. P*1b, 73. Px1c+, 74. Px1c, 75. B*7a, 76. +S-2e, 77. B3ex4d, 78. Gx4d, 79. Bx4d+, 80. S-3c, 81. +B-7a, 82. R-4b, 83. P*3d, 84. Sx3d, 85. N*4f, 86. R*3i, 87. S*4h, 88. R-3f+, 89. +Bx8a, 90. P*4e, 91. Nx3d, 92. +Rx3d, 93. +Bx9a, 94. P-8f, 95. +Bx6d, 96. Px8g+, 97. Kx8g, 98. P*8e, 99. K-8h, 100. N*8f, 101. G7h-6h, 102. P-9f, 103. P*3e, 104. +Sx3e, 105. P*3f, 106. +Sx3f, 107. L*3i, 108. N*9e, 109. N*2f 110. +R-3e 111. Sx8f, 112. R-6b, 113. Sx9e, 114. Rx6d, 115. Lx3f, 116. +Rx3f, 117. S*4d, 118. P-1d, 119. N*3d, 120. K-1b, 121. S*3c, 122. L*8f, 123. Sx8f, 124. Px8f, 125. N*2d, 126. Px2d, 127. Sx3b, 128. P-8g+, 129. Kx8g, 130. L*8a, 131. P*8d, 132. Lx8d, 133. P*8e, 134. Rx6g+, 135. Gx6g, 136. Lx8e+, 137. Kx9f, 138. G*8f, 139. K-9e, 140. B*7c, 141. G*8d, 142. P*9d, 143. Kx9d, 144. B*7b, 145. L*8c, 146. P*9c, 147. Gx9c gote resigns (diagram)

The final tournament bracket is shown below.

Other
 Sente won 29 (almost 60%) of the 49 games.
 The average number of moves per main tournament game was 106. The most moves played in a single game was 157 (Rd. 1, Sugimoto 7d vs. Ina 6d) while the fewest moves played was 63 (Rd. 3, Watanabe Ryūō vs. Abe 5d).
The age breakdown (age at start of the tournament) for the players who qualified was as follows: 10–19 years old, 2 players; 20–29 years old, 15 players; 30–39 years old, 14 players; 40–49 years old, 17 players; 50–59 years old, 1 player; 60 years old or older, 1 player. The oldest player was Keiji Mori 9d (64 years old) and the youngest players were Tatsuya Sugai 4d and Takuya Nagase 4d (both 18 years old).
 For only the second time in the history of a tournament, a "student" was paired against their "teacher" when Tatsuya Sugai played Keita Inoue in Rd. 2.  The only other time this had occurred to date was when Daisuke Nakagawa beat his teacher Kunio Yonenaga in quarterfinals of the 45th NHK Cup (1995).

See also
62nd NHK Cup (shogi)
63rd NHK Cup (shogi)
64th NHK Cup (shogi)

Notes

References

NHK Cup (shogi)
Japanese television series
NHK original programming